In fluid dynamics, the drag coefficient (commonly denoted as: ,  or ) is a dimensionless quantity that is used to quantify the drag or resistance of an object in a fluid environment, such as air or water. It is used in the drag equation in which a lower drag coefficient indicates the object will have less aerodynamic or hydrodynamic drag. The drag coefficient is always associated with a particular surface area.

The drag coefficient of any object comprises the effects of the two basic contributors to fluid dynamic drag: skin friction and form drag. The drag coefficient of a lifting airfoil or hydrofoil also includes the effects of lift-induced drag. The drag coefficient of a complete structure such as an aircraft also includes the effects of interference drag.

Definition 

The drag coefficient  is defined as

where:
  is the drag force, which is by definition the force component in the direction of the flow velocity;
  is the mass density of the fluid;
  is the flow speed of the object relative to the fluid;
  is the reference area

The reference area depends on what type of drag coefficient is being measured. For automobiles and many other objects, the reference area is the projected frontal area of the vehicle. This may not necessarily be the cross-sectional area of the vehicle, depending on where the cross-section is taken. For example, for a sphere  (note this is not the surface area = ).

For airfoils, the reference area is the nominal wing area. Since this tends to be large compared to the frontal area, the resulting drag coefficients tend to be low, much lower than for a car with the same drag, frontal area, and speed.

Airships and some bodies of revolution use the volumetric drag coefficient, in which the reference area is the square of the cube root of the airship volume (volume to the two-thirds power). Submerged streamlined bodies use the wetted surface area.

Two objects having the same reference area moving at the same speed through a fluid will experience a drag force proportional to their respective drag coefficients. Coefficients for unstreamlined objects can be 1 or more, for streamlined objects much less.

Background 

The drag equation

is essentially a statement that the drag force on any object is proportional to the density of the fluid and proportional to the square of the relative flow speed between the object and the fluid. The factor of  comes from the dynamic pressure of the fluid, which is equal to the kinetic energy density.

For certain body shapes, the drag coefficient  only depends on the Reynolds number , Mach number  and the direction of the flow. For low Mach number , the drag coefficient is independent of Mach number. Also, the variation with Reynolds number  within a practical range of interest is usually small, while for cars at highway speed and aircraft at cruising speed, the incoming flow direction is also more-or-less the same. Therefore, the drag coefficient  can often be treated as a constant.

For a streamlined body to achieve a low drag coefficient, the boundary layer around the body must remain attached to the surface of the body for as long as possible, causing the wake to be narrow. A high form drag results in a broad wake. The boundary layer will transition from laminar to turbulent if Reynolds number of the flow around the body is sufficiently great. Larger velocities, larger objects, and lower viscosities contribute to larger Reynolds numbers.

For other objects, such as small particles, one can no longer consider that the drag coefficient  is constant, but certainly is a function of Reynolds number.
At a low Reynolds number, the flow around the object does not transition to turbulent but remains laminar, even up to the point at which it separates from the surface of the object. The Reynolds number will be low for small objects, low velocities, and high viscosity fluids.

A  equal to 1 would be obtained in a case where all of the fluid approaching the object is brought to rest, building up stagnation pressure over the whole front surface. The top figure shows a flat plate with the fluid coming from the right and stopping at the plate. The graph to the left of it shows equal pressure across the surface. In a real flat plate, the fluid must turn around the sides, and full stagnation pressure is found only at the center, dropping off toward the edges as in the lower figure and graph. The overall  of a real square flat plate perpendicular to the flow is often given as 1.17. Flow patterns and therefore  for some shapes can change with the Reynolds number and the roughness of the surfaces.

Drag coefficient examples

General 
In general,  is not an absolute constant for a given body shape. It varies with the speed of airflow (or more generally with Reynolds number ). A smooth sphere, for example, has a  that varies from high values for laminar flow to 0.47 for turbulent flow.  Although the drag coefficient decreases with increasing , the drag force increases.

Aircraft 
As noted above, aircraft use their wing area as the reference area when computing , while automobiles (and many other objects) use projected frontal area; thus, coefficients are not directly comparable between these classes of vehicles.

Automobile

Blunt and streamlined body flows

Concept 
The force between a fluid and a body, when there is relative motion, can only be transmitted by normal pressure and tangential friction stresses. So, for the whole body, the drag part of the force, which is in-line with the approaching fluid motion, is composed of frictional drag (viscous drag) and pressure drag (form drag). The total drag and component drag forces can be related as follows:

where:
A is the planform area of the body,
S is the wet surface of the body,
 is the pressure drag coefficient,
 is the friction drag coefficient,
 is the unit vector in the direction of the shear stress acting on the body surface dS,
 is the unit vector in the direction perpendicular to the body surface dS, pointing from the fluid to the solid,
 magnitude of the shear stress acting on the body surface dS,
 is the pressure far away from the body (note that this constant does not affect the final result),
 is pressure at surface dS,
 is the unit vector in direction of free stream flow

Therefore, when the drag is dominated by a frictional component, the body is called a streamlined body; whereas in the case of dominant pressure drag, the body is called a blunt or bluff body. Thus, the shape of the body and the angle of attack determine the type of drag. For example, an airfoil is considered as a body with a small angle of attack by the fluid flowing across it. This means that it has attached boundary layers, which produce much less pressure drag.

The wake produced is very small and drag is dominated by the friction component. Therefore, such a body (here an airfoil) is described as streamlined, whereas for bodies with fluid flow at high angles of attack, boundary layer separation takes place. This mainly occurs due to adverse pressure gradients at the top and rear parts of an airfoil.

Due to this, wake formation takes place, which consequently leads to eddy formation and pressure loss due to pressure drag. In such situations, the airfoil is stalled and has higher pressure drag than friction drag. In this case, the body is described as a blunt body.

A streamlined body looks like a fish (Tuna), Oropesa, etc. or an airfoil with small angle of attack, whereas a blunt body looks like a brick, a cylinder or an airfoil with high angle of attack. For a given frontal area and velocity, a streamlined body will have lower resistance than a blunt body. Cylinders and spheres are taken as blunt bodies because the drag is dominated by the pressure component in the wake region at high Reynolds number.

To reduce this drag, either the flow separation could be reduced or the surface area in contact with the fluid could be reduced (to reduce friction drag). This reduction is necessary in devices like cars, bicycle, etc. to avoid vibration and noise production.

Practical example 
The aerodynamic design of cars has evolved from the 1920s to the end of the 20th century. This change in design from a blunt body to a more streamlined body reduced the drag coefficient from about 0.95 to 0.30.

See also 
 Automotive aerodynamics
 Automobile drag coefficient
 Ballistic coefficient
 Drag crisis
 Zero-lift drag coefficient

Notes

References 
 L. J. Clancy (1975): Aerodynamics. Pitman Publishing Limited, London, 
 Abbott, Ira H., and Von Doenhoff, Albert E. (1959): Theory of Wing Sections. Dover Publications Inc., New York, Standard Book Number 486-60586-8
 Hoerner, Dr. Sighard F., Fluid-Dynamic Drag, Hoerner Fluid Dynamics, Bricktown New Jersey, 1965.
 Bluff Body: http://user.engineering.uiowa.edu/~me_160/lecture_notes/Bluff%20Body2.pdf
 Drag of Blunt Bodies and Streamlined Bodies: http://www.princeton.edu/~asmits/Bicycle_web/blunt.html
 Hucho, W.H., Janssen, L.J., Emmelmann, H.J. 6(1975): The optimization of body details-A method for reducing the aerodynamics drag. SAE 760185.

Drag (physics)
Aerospace engineering
Dimensionless numbers of fluid mechanics